Mid-office automation captures Passenger name record data from a variety of global distribution systems (Sabre, Galileo, Amadeus, and Worldspan) sources and lets travel agencies create custom business rules to validate reservation accuracy, monitor travel policies, perform file finishing, prepare itineraries/invoices and process ticketing.

Quality control software is used for such functions as ensuring reservations are formatted properly, checking for lower fares and watching for seat availability, upgrades, waitlist clearance, and taking advantage of back to back ticketing opportunities. When customized, such tools allow agencies and corporate accounts to monitor virtually any information in global distribution system passenger name records. Accelerating such tools also creates opportunities for customer relationship management. (a)

Mid-office automation is key to increasing the touchless rate of online adoption.

References
"COMPLEAT mid-office automation software" by Concur Technologies Inc. 
"Mid-Office Software solution of the next generation for all companies sizes" by Boenso Travel IT Solutions 
"XChange Mid-office" by QuadLabs Technologies Pvt ltd 
"The Myth of Online Adoption" at Cornerstone Info Sys 
"Fusion of Oracle Mid-Office Travel Management with Online Corporate Travel Tools" at MP Travel Pty Ltd (Australia)

"What is the Best Fare in Today's Market"  by RightRez, Inc.

"Mid-office / ERP software features for travel companies" by Midoco GmbH. 

Travel agencies